Aké: The Years of Childhood is a 1981 memoir by Nigerian writer Wole Soyinka.

Background and reception
It tells the story of Soyinka's boyhood before and during World War II in a Yoruba village in western Nigeria called Aké, where the author spent the first 12 years of his life, before moving in 1946 to the Government College in Ibadan. When the book was first published, The New York Times reviewer wrote: Playwright, poet, novelist, polemical essayist and now autobiographer, Mr. Soyinka is unquestionably Africa's most versatile writer and arguably her finest. In Ake he has produced an account of his childhood as a Yoruba in western Nigeria that is destined to become a classic of African autobiography, indeed a classic of childhood memoirs wherever and whenever produced....Through recollection, restoration and re-creation, he conveys a personal vision that was formed by the childhood world that he now returns to evoke and exalt in his autobiography. This is the ideal circle of autobiography at its best. It is what makes Ake, in addition to its other great virtues, the best available introduction to the work of one of the liveliest, most exciting writers in the world today." Aké: The Years of Childhood was awarded an Anisfield-Wolf Award in 1983. 

Other autobiographical writings by Soyinka include The Man Died (1972), Isara: A Voyage Around "Essay" (1989), Ibadan: The "Penkelemes" Years, A Memoir, 1946–1965 (1994), and You Must Set Forth at Dawn (2006).

Adaptations
In 1995 BBC Radio 4 broadcast a 10-part abridgement (by Margaret Busby) in the Book at Bedtime series, read by Colin McFarlane and produced by Sally Avens.

A film adaptation of Ake, directed by Dapo Adeniyi and written by Wole Soyinka, was previewed in 2017.

References

External links
 "Wole Soyinka's Aké: The Years of Childhood" blog.

Memoirs
1981 non-fiction books
Works by Wole Soyinka
Childhood in Nigeria